The Fourth Army Corps was a unit of the United States Army raised for the Spanish–American War. After the declaration of war, General Order 36 of May 7, 1898 approved the organization of eight "army corps," each of which was to consist of three or more divisions of three brigades each.

Each brigade was to have approximately 3,600 officers and enlisted men organized into three regiments and, with three such brigades, each division was to total about 11,000 officers and men. Thus the division was to be about the same size as the division of 1861, but army corps were to be larger. The division staff initially was to have an adjutant general, quartermaster, commissary, surgeon, inspector general and engineer, with an ordnance officer added later. The brigade staff was identical except that no inspector general or ordnance officer was authorized.

General Order 46 of May 16, 1898 assigned commanding officers and training camps to the new corps. Major General John J. Coppinger was named as commander of Fourth Army Corps, which was to assemble at Mobile, Alabama. Instead of seeing combat, the corps spent the summer traveling the railways of Alabama and Florida; on June 2, it began moving to Tampa, Florida and on July 3, the Third Division of the corps (division numbers of this era were not unique) was transferred to Fernandina, Florida. In the meantime, the First Division, under the command of Brigadier General Theodore Schwan, was transferred to Miami on June 20. On June 27, the Fourth and Seventh Army Corps exchanged their First Divisions, the Seventh's having remained in Tampa when the corps headquarters moved to Jacksonville, Florida.

On August 11, with the end of the war in sight, the corps was transferred again, to Huntsville, Alabama.

Upon the retirement of General Coppinger, Major General Joseph Wheeler (USV) took command on October 13, and stayed at the head of the corps until December 3. A revolving door of commanders led the Fourth through the remainder of its service, as follows:

 Brigadier General A.K. Arnold (USV), December 14–20, 1898
 Major General Henry W. Lawton (USV), December 20–29, 1898
 Brigadier General Royal T. Frank, December 29, 1898 – January 16, 1899

At the same time Frank took command of the corps, its headquarters was transferred to Anniston, Alabama. The Fourth Army Corps was "discontinued" on January 16, 1899; its strength on the last day of 1898 was 545 officers and 13,337 enlisted men.

References

Military units and formations of the United States in the Spanish–American War
Military units and formations established in 1898